Medicine is the third studio album by English musician Pop Levi. It was released on 12 November 2012 by Counter Records, an imprint of Ninja Tune.

Critical reception
Medicine was met with "mixed or average" reviews from critics. At Metacritic, which assigns a weighted average rating out of 100 to reviews from mainstream publications, this release received an average score of 55 based on 9 reviews.

Writing for AllMusic, Tim Sendra explained: "Most of the record is very straight-ahead and trad-sounding. While Levi does play a pretty convincing rocker with his elfin, Bolan-pretty voice and the nicely punchy production, the songs overall come off a little clichéd, and the process of stripping down the sound removed too much of what was interesting on Levi’s previous efforts." Bryant Kitching of Consequence of Sound gave the release an unfavourable review by giving it an "F", while noting that "Despite the occasional glimpse of colorful ingenuity, Medicine is an utterly sour experience." At Exclaim!, Michael Edwards said: "Levi hasn't exactly grown with each and every album, and his wheel spinning has gotten the better of him again, because, apart from a couple of catchy tunes, Medicine isn't very exciting. "

In a review for The Line of Best Fit, Tim Lee gave the release a 6.5 out of 10, writing: "There are times on Medicine where there is enough self-referential nodding and winking going on to give yourself whiplash. Levi is exactly the kind of lunatic you want making music, Medicine is too much of a cipher to be anything more than a fleeting fancy."

Track listing

Personnel
Credits adapted from AllMusic.

Musicians
 Richard Levi – vocals
 Luke Muscatelli – bass
 Marius Simonsen – drums

Production
 Mozambique Courier – engineer
 Jonas Raabe – engineer, mixing
 Max Gilkes – mastering
 Travis Huff – mixing

References

External links
 Medicine at Ninja Tune
 

2012 albums
Pop Levi albums